Sara González may refer to:

 Sara González (footballer) (born 1989), Spanish footballer
 Sara M. Gonzalez, New York City Council member
 Sara González Gómez (?–2012), Cuban singer
 Sara González Lolo (born 1992), Spanish quad hockey player